Actinopus goloboffi is a species of mygalomorph spiders in the family Actinopodidae. It is found in Argentina.

References

goloboffi
Spiders described in 2014